Urbana is a major Christian student missions conference sponsored by InterVarsity Christian Fellowship. The event is designed to inform Christian students about global issues and issues around the world that missionaries face. The conference also encourages students to explore the biblical mandate for cross-cultural missions and encourages them to participate in missions.

Each Urbana lasts for 5 days at the end of December and ends with a final communion on New Year's Eve. In addition to the main speakers, participants are offered a choice of dozens of seminars offered throughout the week, relating to specific topics within the general theme of the university and international missions. Worship is also a major highlight of the convention; special attention is paid to incorporating diverse worship styles, even including songs in foreign languages.

The first/precursor “Urbana” Student Missions Convention was held in 1946 in Toronto, and since then, it has generally been held every three years. From 1948 to 2003, Urbana took place at the University of Illinois at Urbana–Champaign, with the primary venue after 1963 being the Assembly Hall (now State Farm Center), the school's basketball arena.

Conference Elements 

Each conference is filled with a variety of activities and seminars for students to engage in.  Highlights include an exhibit hall in which students are encouraged to network with leaders from 250+ missions organizations and seminaries. Furthermore, each morning and evening all participates gather in the Edward Jones Dome to hear from engaging and relevant world mission speakers and worship, with a focus specifically on multi-ethnic worship.  The conference concludes with the conference participants welcoming in the New Year and participating in communion.  Students are also encouraged to participate in a variety of seminars and "tracks", which specialize in specific topics.  For example, topics are known to include  Business and technology, global issues, healthcare, justice, proclamation, and world religions.  Students participating in a "track" allows them to complement their experience by focusing on particular issues during the afternoons at Urbana. Topics have been known to include the role of technology, business, International Students, Poverty, and Pastors/Church Leaders. In addition to the seminars offered, students are encouraged to participate in Bible Studies.

History

1940s 
The first Urbana was held in 1946 at the University of Toronto in Toronto, Ontario, Canada. 151 colleges, universities, and seminaries from across North America were represented, along with 100 missionaries. L. E. Maxwell, president of Prairie Bible Institute, and other noted Christian leaders in academia spoke at the December event. The second Urbana was held in 1948, this time at the University of Illinois at Champaign-Urbana. Jim Elliot, known for his missionary work and martyrdom in Ecuador, attended this Urbana as a student. The slogan for this Urbana was "From Every Campus to Every Country." 1,300 students from 154 campuses participated. Speakers included Frank Houghton, V. Raymond Edman, and Billy Graham.

1950s 
The 1954 Urbana had the theme "Changing World; Changeless Christ" and hosted 2,000 students from 263 schools. The number of students attending Urbana grew to 3,500 in 1957, and the theme that year was "One Lord—One Church—One World." Billy Graham returned to speak at this conference, and was joined by the likes of Donald Barnhouse and Harold Ockenga. Urbana 57 was held in a gymnasium with poor acoustics, and with the University of Illinois set to finish building a new assembly room by 1961, the next Urbana was postponed until then.

1960s 
Urbana 61 had a change in format from previous conferences. It featured a "plenary panel" about mission work, a "plenary forum" that involved a question-and-answer time with various Christian leaders, elective courses on specific topics related to missions, missionary sessions, and a pastoral group. The theme was "Commission—Conflict—Commitment." 5,400 students participated in this conference. Eugene Nida, Arthur Glasser, and Urbana veterans David Howard Adeney and Billy Graham were speakers. Festo Kivengere preached on Jacob and Esau.

1970s 
Urbana 76 was themed "Declare His Glory Among the Nations." John Stott spoke on the biblical basis for mission, Elisabeth Elliot on the will of God, and Helen Roseveare on Declaring His Glory in Suffering. 17,000 students participated in 1,700 small groups, meeting each morning for Bible study and every evening for prayer. "That All Nations Might Believe and Obey Jesus Christ" was the theme for Urbana 79. Many speakers made repeat appearances, including John Stott, Billy Graham, and Elisabeth Elliot. Joining them were Luis Palau, David Howard Adeney, and others. Urbana 79 experienced capacity issues due to so many students wanting to attend that the next conference would be held just two years later.

1980s 
Urbana 81 was themed "Let Every Tongue Confess That Jesus Christ Is Lord" and 14,000 attended. One unusual characteristic of this Urbana was that it came only two years after the previous one. Speakers included Wycliffe Bible translator Ed Beach, Eric Alexander from a church in Scotland, Gordon MacDonald, Isabelo Magalit, Marilyn Laszlo, Billy Graham, George McKinney, and author Rebecca Manley Pippert.

Urbana 84 attracted 18,000 participants. Eric Alexander spoke on the conference theme "Faithful in Christ Jesus" from the book of Ephesians. Other notable speakers: Ada Lum, Billy Graham, Cliffe Knechtle, David Bryant, George McKinney, Joanne Shetler, John Kyle, Luis Palau, Mariano DiGangi, Ray Bakke, and Tokunboh Adayemo.

Urbana 87 took its theme from the Book of Jonah: "Should I not be concerned?" Nearly 19,000 participants came to hear Harvie Conn, Ray Bakke, Floyd McClung, Billy Graham, Helen Roseveare, Rebecca Manley Pippert, Roberta Hestenes, and Tony Campolo. Nearly 6,000 attendees indicated they felt they were being called by God to serve in overseas missions.

1990s 
Throughout the 90s, Urbana was hosted at the University of Illinois at Urbana–Champaign, but the large numbers in attendance meant that the conference was pushing that venue's capacity. In these years, the conference was updated in significant ways.

Urbana 90 was InterVarsity's 16th triennial student mission convention, was themed "Jesus Christ: Lord of the Universe, Hope of the World." Almost 20,000 people met December 27–31, 1990. Featured speakers included Joni Eareckson Tada, Ada Lum, Ajith Fernando, Caesar Molebatsi, George Otis, Glandion Carney, Isaac Canales, Luis Bush, M. Fisher, Paul Tokunaga, Peter Kuzmic and Philemon Choi. It was the first Urbana featuring a full 'contemporary' worship band and a prayer ministry team composed of campus staff members.

Urbana 93 (entitled "God So Loves the World") attracted over 17,000 attendees. Featured speakers included Neil Anderson, Lindsay Brown, Isaac Canales, Peter Cha,  Margarita Petrovna Dvorzhetskaya, Ajith Fernando, Mary Fisher, Steve Hayner, David Zac Niringiye and Ravi Zacharias. Bruce Kuhn offered dramatic presentations of Bible passages.

Urbana 96 (entitled "You Are My Witnesses") was the 50th anniversary of Urbana (counting back to the original InterVarsity student mission convention in Toronto in 1946). Over 19,600 were in attendance, making it the largest student missions gathering in the world. Featured speakers: Tokunboh Adeyemo, Rebecca Atallah, Jorge Atiencia, Robbie Castleman, Alex Gee, Steve Hayner, Jacqueline Huggins, Daniel Oh, Mac Pier, T.V. Thomas, and George Verwer. Bruce Kuhn returned to offer dramatic enactments of Scripture.

2000s 
The 2000s marked the move of Urbana from its long-time home at the University of Illinois at Urbana–Champaign and into St. Louis in 2006—a much larger venue for a conference that seemed to be maxing out every year. The new venue allowed nearly all of the convention to be held under one roof, with students staying in different hotels within the city and walking or transiting to the conference.

Urbana 2000, InterVarsity's 19th triennial student missions convention (themed "Because God First Loved Us"), was an unusual Urbana in that it was scheduled four years (vs. the traditional three) after the previous conference, to avoid possible Y2K complications. Over 20,000 participated. Featured speakers included: Vinoth Ramachandra, Ken Fong, Steve Hayner, George Verwer, Jimmy McGee, Paul Borthwick, Marta Bennett, Barney Ford, and Alex Gee. Over 5,000 committed their lives to cross-cultural missions as their vocation.

The last Urbana to be held at UIUC, Urbana 2003, was also the first to offer an "International Student Track", providing special housing options and electives to international students interested in spending time with other students from their respective countries. Urbana 06 again held a track for international students, as well as tracks that focused on the global HIV–AIDS pandemic, the growing business as mission movement, and the needs of the world's largest slum communities in the developing world. Major and tracks at Urbana 09 included International Students, Arts and Media, Advocacy and Poverty, Business as Mission, Evangelism, Jesus and Justice, The Mission of Healthcare, and The Church Around the World.

At Urbana 2006, nearly 22,500 participants attended. Urbana 06 speakers included Rick Warren, pastor and author of The Purpose Driven Life; Ray Bakke, a professor and specialist in urban ministry; Bono from the band U2 (via video); and Ajith Fernando, a well-respected Bible teacher who is the director of Youth for Christ in Sri Lanka.

Urbana 09 speakers included Ramez Atallah, General Secretary of the Bible Society of Egypt; Shane Claiborne of The Simple Way in Philadelphia; Ruth Padilla DeBorst, General Secretary of the Latin American Theological Fellowship; Sunder Krishnan, Senior Pastor of the Rexdale Alliance Church in Ontario, Canada; and Patrick Fung, General Director of OMF International. Oscar Muriu, Senior Pastor of Nairobi Chapel, Nairobi, Kenya, spoke at both Urbana 06 and Urbana 09.  Worship at Urbana 09 was led by Sandra Maria Van Opstal.

2010s 
Urbana 12 speakers included Calisto Odede, David Platt, Chai Ling, Daniel Bourdanne, Ziel Machado, Geri Rodman, and Terry LeBlanc. Sandra Maria Van Opstal, Executive Pastor of Grace and Peace Community in Chicago, was the Director of Worship in 2009 and 2012 with a focus on the integration of multiethnic worship and mission.  Urbana 12 also included a Caregiver Kit Build: the 15,000 attendees assembled 32,000 Caregiver Kits which were then shipped to volunteer caregivers who work with AIDS patients in Swaziland and other African countries.

Notable Speakers 
 Tony Campolo, 1987
 Shane Claiborne, 2009
 Joni Eareckson Tada, 1990
 Elisabeth Elliot, 1973, 1976, 1979, 1984, 1996
 Billy Graham, 1948, 1957, 1961, 1964, 1976, 1979, 1981, 1984, 1987
 John Stott, 1967, 1970, 1973, 1976, 1979
 A.W. Tozer, 1954
 Rick Warren, 2006
 Ravi Zacharias, 1993
 Francis Chan, 2015
 George Verwer, 1967, 1987, 1996, 2000
 Helen Roseveare, 1976, 1981, 1987
 Luis Palau, 1973,1976, 1979, 1984
 Steve Hayner, 1993, 2000
 David Platt, 2012, 2015

See also 
College religious organizations
International Fellowship of Evangelical Students
Disciple (Christianity)
Passion Conferences
World Student Christian Federation
Christian Camp and Conference Association
The gospel

References

External links
 Urbana
InterVarsity
Inter-Varsity Canada
Urbana Gets Radical

Christian missions
Evangelical Christian conferences
Evangelicalism in North America